Festuca hyperborea is a species of grass in the family Poaceae. This species is native to Greenland, Kamchatka, Krasnoyarsk, Labrador, Magadan, North European Russi, Northwest Territorie, Nunavut, Québec, Svalbard, Yakutskiya, and Yukon. Is perennial and mainly grows in subalpine or subarctic biomes. Festuca hyperborea was first described in 1957.

References

Plants described in 1957
Flora of Greenland
Flora of Kamchatka Krai
Flora of Labrador
Flora of Magadan Oblast
Flora of the Northwest Territories
Flora of Nunavut
Flora of Quebec
Flora of Svalbard
Flora of Yukon
hyperborea